Luna 10 (or Lunik 10) was a 1966 Soviet lunar robotic spacecraft mission in the Luna program. It was the first artificial satellite of the Moon.

Luna 10 conducted extensive research in lunar orbit, gathering important data on the strength of the Moon's magnetic field, its radiation belts, and the nature of lunar rocks (which were found to be comparable to terrestrial basalt rocks), cosmic radiation, and micrometeoroid density. Perhaps its most important finding was the first evidence of mass concentrations (called "mascons") — areas of high density below the mare basins that distort lunar orbital trajectories. Their discovery has usually been credited to the American Lunar Orbiter series.

The spacecraft
Part of the E-6S series, Luna 10 was battery powered and had an on-orbit dry mass of 540 kg. Scientific instruments included a gamma-ray spectrometer for energies between 0.3–3 MeV (50–500 pJ), a triaxial magnetometer, a meteorite detector, instruments for solar-plasma studies, and devices for measuring infrared emissions from the Moon and radiation conditions of the lunar environment. Gravitational studies were also conducted.

The flight
Luna 10 launched towards the Moon on 31 March 1966 at 10:48 GMT.

After a midcourse correction on 1 April, the spacecraft entered lunar orbit on 3 April 1966 and completed its first orbit 3 hours later (on 4 April Moscow time). A 245-kilogram instrument compartment separated from the main bus, which was in a 350 x 1,000-kilometer orbit inclined at 71.9° to the lunar equator.

Luna 10 operated for 460 lunar orbits and performed 219 active data transmissions before radio signals were discontinued on 30 May 1966.

The Internationale
The spacecraft carried a set of solid-state oscillators that had been programmed to reproduce the notes of "The Internationale", so that it could be broadcast live to the 23rd Congress of the Communist Party of the Soviet Union. During a rehearsal on the night of 3 April, the playback went well, but the following morning, controllers discovered a missing note and played the previous night's tape to the assembled gathering at the Congress — claiming it was a live broadcast from the Moon.

References

External links

 Zarya - Luna 10 chronology

Luna programme
Spacecraft launched in 1966
1966 in the Soviet Union
Spacecraft launched by Molniya-M rockets
Satellites orbiting the Moon
Non Earth orbiting satellites of the Soviet Union